Geoffrey Beaumont (1903–1970) was an Anglican priest and monk of the Community of the Resurrection who was also a composer of popular songs and hymn tunes. After graduation he attended Ely Theological College and was ordained in 1932 to a curacy in Nunhead.  During the war he served as a chaplain in the RNVR, for which he was awarded the MBE. From 1947 to 1952 he was  chaplain of Trinity College, Cambridge. In 1961 he entered the Community of the Resurrection.

With Patrick Appleford he founded the '20th Century Church Light Music Group' and edited several new collections of hymns of which many are found in various hymnals and are still sung today. Probably his best known hymn tune is "Hatherop Castle" set for the words "O Jesus I have promised". His Twentieth Century Folk Mass (1957) was also very popular in the 1960s.

References

External links
 Biographical entry at Canterbury Dictionary of Hymnology

1903 births
1970 deaths
20th-century Church of England clergy
English organists
British male organists
Members of Anglican religious orders
20th-century classical musicians
20th-century English composers
20th-century organists
20th-century British male musicians
20th-century British musicians